Homayoun Sanaatizadeh (1925 in Tehran – 2009 in Kerman, Iran) was an Iranian writer, translator. Besides his writings he is well known for his attempts to fight against poverty and illiteracy. He is the founder of Pars paper, Offset printing, pocket books, and Golab Zahra. Founding Iran's branch of Franklyn publication is one of his notable works.

Critical reception 
A 2019 documentary is made by Pirooz Kalantari under the title "Homayoun" in which the filmmaker tries to trace the challenges and  the course of life of Homayoun Sanaatizadeh through his writings and the memories of those close to him.

References

External links
 Publication of the film Homayoun- Liam Gallery
 Homayoun, 2019

1925 births
2009 deaths
Iranian writers
People from Kerman Province